"Amarillo by Morning" is a country music song written by Terry Stafford and Paul Fraser, and recorded in a country pop style by Stafford as a single in 1973 to minor success. The song would be popularized in a fiddle-based Western rendition by Texas neotraditionalist George Strait in 1982.

Content
The song is sung from the point of view of a rodeo cowboy, driving at night from San Antonio to a county fair in Amarillo, that will begin the following morning. The man recounts the hardships his occupation has caused him, including divorce, broken bones, and poverty, but states that he does not regret his lifestyle: "I ain't rich/ But Lord, I'm free." The song has appeared in several lists of the best country songs.

Original recording
Stafford conceived the song after playing with his band at a rodeo in San Antonio, Texas, and then driving back to his home in Amarillo, Texas. Stafford conveyed the concept and title he pulled from a FedEx commercial to Paul Fraser over the phone and by the next morning Paul had written the song. 

Stafford recorded the song on his Say, Has Anybody Seen My Sweet Gypsy Rose album, released in 1973. The single was released August 2, 1973, by Atlantic Records with the master number 26867. The single "Say, Has Anybody Seen My Sweet Gypsy Rose" had been previously released as an A-side 45 (Atlantic Master 26868; June 7, 1973), but due to the success of "Amarillo by Morning", the single was re-released October 4, 1973, as the A-side (Atlantic Master  26867-1 stereo and Atlantic Master 26867-2 mono), with "Say, Has Anybody Seen My Sweet Gypsy Rose" on the B-side. The song entered the Cash Box Country Looking Ahead chart November 3, 1973, the Cash Box Country chart on December 15, 1973, peaking at #37, the Billboard Country chart December 1, 1973, peaking at #31, the Record World Country chart December 15, 1973, peaking at #50, and Canada RPM Country chart January 26, 1974, peaking at number 38.

George Strait version

George Strait recorded the song for his 1982 album Strait from the Heart (LP MCA 5320). It was released on MCA as a single, release number 52162. The publisher's release was January 14, 1983, and the full release came February 16, 1983. The single entered the Billboard Country chart February 12, 1983, peaking at #4. It has since become one of Strait's signature songs. 

This cover woke up Rick Husband while he commanded the ill-fated STS-107 scientific space mission, and was played for the entire crew during STS-114 in honor of the Amarillo-born astronaut.

Critical reception
"Amarillo by Morning" is widely considered to be one of Strait's best songs. Billboard and American Songwriter ranked the song number nine and number six, respectively, on their lists of the 10 greatest George Strait songs.

Kevin John Coyne of Country Universe gave the song an A grade, saying that he has "finally found his niche as a performer." He goes on to say that the "simple arrangement and understated delivery are the defining elements of just about every Strait record since."

Chart performance

Certifications

Other cover versions
The song has been covered by numerous artists, including rodeo champion Chris LeDoux in 1975 on his album Life as a Rodeo Man, Asleep at the Wheel and John Arthur Martinez on his 2004 album Lone Starry Night.

South Texas recording artist Clifton Jansky from San Antonio recorded the song in November 1979 in Ludwig Studios in Houston, Texas. He had a regional hit in Texas, Oklahoma, New Mexico and Louisiana. Three years later, he exchanged soundtracks with Kelly Schoppa in Houston. He traded his soundtrack to "Amarillo by Morning" for a duet that Kelly had recorded in Nashville with Janie Fricke and no money changed hands.

Canadian indie rock artist Fancey covered the song on his 2018 album of 1960s and 1970s country songs County Fair. Brazilian singer Zé Ramalho also recorded the song, with different lyrics.

Legacy
"Amarillo by Morning" was named "#12 country song of all time" by Country Music Television in 2004. In 2010, members of the Western Writers of America chose it as one of the Top 100 Western songs of all time. A 2003 survey of tourism-related officials by Development Counsellors International named "Amarillo by Morning" the 7th-best song about a place.

The song is regularly played at rodeos.

The song was parodied by hosts Brad Paisley and Carrie Underwood at the 2013 Country Music Association Awards as "Obamacare by Morning", which mocked technical problems with that year's rollout of the federal HealthCare.gov website as part of the Affordable Care Act.

References

Songs about cowboys and cowgirls
1973 singles
1983 singles
1973 songs
Terry Stafford songs
George Strait songs
Songs about Texas
Songs about cities in the United States
Songs written by Terry Stafford
Atlantic Records singles
MCA Nashville Records singles